Andrea Sarah "Andie" Worrall (born 1 April 1977) is an English-born Welsh international footballer, who played as a goalkeeper.

Club career

Early career
Worrall began playing for Tameside MBC after watching her father play football for a pub team throughout her childhood. She had been prevented from playing organised football at school because she was female.

Senior career
Her senior career has taken in Stockport Girls/Ladies, Everton Ladies, Liverpool Ladies, Manchester City Ladies, Leeds United Ladies and Stockport County Ladies.

Worrall played at Wembley with Everton in August 1998. The Blues lost the inaugural AXA Challenge Trophy to Arsenal on penalties, despite Worrall saving from Faye White. She also featured in the 1998–99 FA Women's Premier League Cup final, a 3–1 defeat to Arsenal at Prenton Park in March 1999.

In 2008 Worrall returned to Manchester City Ladies. In March 2011 she made the difficult decision to leave Manchester City for Liverpool Ladies, in order to play in the new FA WSL. Worrall left Liverpool after the 2011 FA WSL season. She rejoined City in February 2013 when fellow goalkeeper Danielle Brown suffered a knee injury.

International career
Worrall was called into the England squad for a friendly against Italy in April 1998.

She later played for Wales, producing "heroics" in a 2–0 European Championship qualifying defeat to Belgium in December 1999. During qualifying for the 2003 FIFA Women's World Cup, Worrall played in a 5–1 defeat to Scotland at Almondvale Stadium in October 2001. She won a total of six caps for Wales.

Personal life
Worrall is an avid supporter of Manchester City and one of relatively few out lesbian footballers.

In October 2013 The Lesbian & Gay Foundation named Worrall 'Homo Heroes Role Model of the Year' for her work in championing LGBT causes. At the time, she was working as a manager for a housing association in deprived inner city areas of Manchester.

References

External links
Andrea Worrall at Liverpool Ladies FA WSL website
Andrea Worrall at FIFA.com

1977 births
Living people
Everton F.C. (women) players
FA Women's National League players
Women's Super League players
Leeds United Women F.C. players
Lesbian sportswomen
LGBT association football players
English LGBT sportspeople
Liverpool F.C. Women players
Footballers from Ashton-under-Lyne
Wales women's international footballers
Welsh women's footballers
Manchester City W.F.C. players
Women's association football goalkeepers
Stockport County L.F.C. players
21st-century Welsh LGBT people